Ryan Moloney (born 24 November 1979) is an Australian actor, known for his portrayal of the fictional character Jarrod "Toadfish" Rebecchi in the Australian soap opera Neighbours since 1995.

Career
Moloney's first acting experience was with the Merilyn Brend Children's Teenagers and Adults Theatre Company in outer-eastern Melbourne when he was ten years old. He starred in their youth repertory production of The Purple Pumpernickel. His first role in a feature film was playing a thug in Say a Little Prayer (1993), based on the Robin Klein novel Came Back to Show You I Could Fly.

Moloney initially auditioned for the role of Brett Stark in Neighbours. He did not get the role but later appeared as a one-off character named Cyborg in 1994. He was later recalled to play Jarrod "Toadfish" Rebecchi, brother of established character Kevin "Stonefish" Rebecchi. This was a one-scene role, which aired on January 23, 1995. This became a recurring guest role and as the character proved popular it became a regular role in 1996. In April 2004 he was nominated for a Golden Rose of Montreux award for Best Actor in a Soap for his work in Neighbours.

Moloney appeared in the Cinderella pantomime as Buttons in 2005 and 2007.

In 2012, Moloney made an appearance on Big Brother's Bit on the Side. That same year, he appeared with his former Neighbours co-star, Mark Little, in an episode of Celebrity Wedding Planner broadcast on 3 September 2012.

In 2013 Moloney appeared on Celebrity Big Brother broadcast on Channel 5.  He finished in third place. Ryan stated in an interview with Lorraine KellyShortly into it, I watched some footage that they had shot and edited in a particular way and I realised that I couldn't actually be myself in there because they can edit it however they want. And the fact that I got to protect the Neighbours brand. But in terms of an experience, it was a crazy experience. It was a one-in-a-lifetime experience.

Moloney subsequently took up the roles of Jack in Dick Whittington at Dunstable's Grove Theatre in 2013 and Buttons in Cinderella at the Stag Theatre in Sevenoaks in 2014. He appeared in a documentary special celebrating Neighbours 30th anniversary titled Neighbours 30th: The Stars Reunite, which aired in Australia and the UK in March 2015.

Moloney has filmed a part in the upcoming film titled "Residence", playing Cyril the King. Following the cancellation of Neighbours in 2022, Moloney featured in The Masked Singer.

Personal life
Moloney is married to Alison Hayward and the couple have two children, Erin Moloney and Jack Moloney.

Moloney is an active patron of the Down Syndrome Association of Victoria, and has been involved with the Victorian Police Department's Films For Schools Youth project.  He also participates in the Forgotten Children Rescue Foundation charity.

In 2010, Moloney became a spokesman for weight loss company Lite and Easy, successfully losing 17 kg in 13 weeks. He also competed in the St. George Melbourne Marathon, completing the race in the official time of 03:46:32.

In early 2011, Moloney revealed that he was training to be a pilot. He took on the hobby in between filming for Neighbours and aims to fly commercial planes in the future.

Moloney was best known in the early days of his Neighbours career for sporting loud shirts, a mullet hairstyle and later a curly ponytail.

He attended school at Heathmont College and Emmaus College, Melbourne.

Filmography

References

External links
 

Australian male soap opera actors
Australian male child actors
1979 births
Living people